Chevy Chase Heights is a census-designated place within White Township, Indiana County, Pennsylvania, United States. The population was 1,502 at the 2010 census.

Geography
Chevy Chase Heights is located at  (40.636325, -79.147385).

Demographics

As of the census of 2000, there were 1,511 people, 669 households, and 418 families residing in the area.  The population density was 1,181.3 people per square mile (455.8/km).  There were 805 housing units at an average density of 629.3/sq mi (242.8/km).  The racial makeup of the CDP was 88.75% White, 8.34% African American, 0.20% Native American, 1.13% Asian, 0.53% from other races, and 1.06% from two or more races. Hispanic or Latino of any race were 0.33% of the population.

There were 669 households, out of which 27.1% had children under the age of 18 living with them, 47.5% were married couples living together, 12.1% had a female householder with no husband present, and 37.4% were non-families. 32.3% of all households were made up of individuals, and 12.0% had someone living alone who was 65 years of age or older.  The average household size was 2.26 and the average family size was 2.84.

In the area the population was spread out, with 22.2% under the age of 18, 9.8% from 18 to 24, 25.3% from 25 to 44, 27.4% from 45 to 64, and 15.4% who were 65 years of age or older.  The median age was 40 years. For every 100 females, there were 96.2 males.  For every 100 females age 18 and over, there were 88.2 males.

The median income for a household in the area was $23,214, and the median income for a family was $34,250. Males had a median income of $36,058 versus $16,250 for females. The per capita income is $18,915.  About 13.4% of families and 20.8% of the population were below the poverty line, including 22.8% of those under age 18 and 8.4% of those age 65 or over.

References

Census-designated places in Indiana County, Pennsylvania
Census-designated places in Pennsylvania